Zsolt Hornyák (born 1 May 1973) is a Slovak football manager and a former defender of Hungarian ethnicity. He is the manager of Hungarian team Puskás Akadémia.

As a player, Hornyák won the Czechoslovakian championship in the 1991/1992 season, and following the separation of the two countries, four Slovakian championships, and two Slovakian cups. Hornyák was capped by Slovakia three times between 2000 and 2001.

International career
Hornyák made his debut for the Slovakia national team in a 2–0 friendly victory over Greece on 15 November 2000. He came on for Vladimír Janočko in the 66th minute. He then appeared as a late substitute in a 1-1 friendly draw with Algeria on 27 February 2001. He made his final appearance for the national team on 7 October 2001 in a 2002 FIFA World Cup qualifying match against Macedonia, which Slovakia won 5-0.

Managerial career
Hornyák worked as a head coach in Armenian football clubs FC Mika and FC Banants from 2011 to 2015. In 2011, he was an assistant coach in FC Mika. In 2012, he became a head coach replacing Slovak Jozef Bubenko. In 2012-2013 season FC Mika won Armenian Premier League silver medals and Supercup. Zsolt Hornyák was appointed as a head coach of FC Banants in 2013 leading the team to the gold medals of Armenian Premier League in 2013/2014 season. That was the first title in Armenian Premier League for FC Banants. In 2014 FC Banants under Zsolt Hornyák won Armenian Supercup. He was included in top 10 Slovak coaches list in 2013 (8th place) and 2014 (6th place).
He signed a contract with FC Slovan Liberec in June 2018.

Honours

Player
ŠK Slovan Bratislava
 Czechoslovak First League Winners (1): 1991-92
 Slovak Super Liga Winners (2): 1994-95, 1998-99

1. FC Košice
 Slovak Super Liga Winners (1): 1996-97

Inter Bratislava
 Slovak Super Liga Winners (2): 1999-00, 2000-01
 Slovak Cup Winners (2): 1999–00, 2000–01

Manager
FC Mika
 Armenian Premier League Runners-Up (1): 2012–13
 Armenian Supercup Winner (1): 2012

FC Banats
 Armenian Premier League Winner (1): 2013–14
 Armenian Supercup Winner (1): 2014

References

External links
 

1973 births
Living people
Slovak footballers
Slovak expatriate footballers
ŠK Slovan Bratislava players
FC VSS Košice players
FK Inter Bratislava players
FC Dynamo Moscow players
AEP Paphos FC players
Slovak football managers
FC Mika managers
FC Urartu managers
Expatriate footballers in Cyprus
Slovak Super Liga players
Expatriate footballers in Russia
Slovak expatriate sportspeople in Russia
Hungarians in Slovakia
Russian Premier League players
Cypriot First Division players
Slovakia international footballers
Slovak expatriate football managers
Expatriate football managers in Armenia
Expatriate football managers in Malta
Expatriate football managers in Russia
Expatriate football managers in the Czech Republic
Mosta F.C. managers
FC Luch Vladivostok managers
FC Slovan Liberec managers
Slovak expatriate sportspeople in the Czech Republic
Association football defenders
Puskás Akadémia FC managers
Nemzeti Bajnokság I managers